The parable of the lamp under a bushel (also known as the lamp under a bowl) is one of the parables of Jesus. It appears in Matthew 5:14–15, Mark  and Luke . In Matthew, the parable is a continuation of the discourse on salt and light in Jesus' Sermon on the Mount. The parable also appears in the non-canonical Gospel of Thomas as saying 33.

Passage

Related passages
In the Gospel of Luke, Jesus says:

In the Gospel of Matthew, Jesus says:

In the Gospel of Mark, Jesus says:

Interpretation
The key idea of the parable is that "Light is to be revealed, not concealed." The light here has been interpreted as referring to Jesus, or to His message,<ref name="BR">Barbara E. Reid, Parables for Preachers: Year B. The Gospel of Mark', Liturgical Press, 1999, pp. 106–107.
</ref> or to the believer's response to that message.

Jesus quotes a pessimistic proverb on how the rich get richer and the poor keep losing even the little they have. He later denounces the saying in the next parable in Mark, which alludes to Joel  in assuring that God's judgment on the ruling powers will come and holds out revolutionary hope to those resigned to thinking that nothing will ever change.

Cornelius a Lapide commenting on this parable writes that allegorically, "saints Hilary, Ambrose, and Bede say, that it is here meant that the light of the Gospel was not to be shut up within the narrow confines of Judæa, but to be placed upon the height of Rome, that it might illuminate all the subject nations. 

John McEvilly writes that, "These words have the same object as the preceding, to stimulate the Apostles to shine as lights before the world, to enlighten the surrounding darkness, and impart to all the world the light of a holy, spotless life, and of pure teaching. As a city on a hill cannot be hid, so neither can the Apostles, from their exalted position, be concealed from the eyes of men; and, hence, their duty, to live so as to edify men. As no one lights a candle for the purpose of concealing its light, so neither did God constitute the Apostles as the lights of the world, in order to hide their light and detain the truth of God in injustice. Their duty is quite plain, viz., to diffuse this light far and near; to be deterred by no obstacles, in the free exercise of the exalted commission confided to them by God Himself, and to show forth the brilliancy of their virtues, and by their example to allure others to God."

Proverb
The parable is the source of the English proverb "to hide one's light under a bushel", the use of the word "bushel", an obsolete word for bowl (now relegated to usage as a unit of measure), appearing in William Tyndale's translation of the New Testament: "Neither do men light a candle, and put it under a bushel, but on a candlestick, and it lighteth all them which are in the house." The original Greek is μόδιος (modios''), usually translated as "basket."

See also
 Life of Jesus in the New Testament
 Ministry of Jesus
 Parable of the Ten Virgins

References

Parables of Jesus
Sermon on the Mount